Chestnut Hills is an unincorporated community in Cumberland County, North Carolina, United States. It lies at an elevation of 190 feet (58 m).

References

Unincorporated communities in Cumberland County, North Carolina
Unincorporated communities in North Carolina